During the 2008–09 season, the Guildford Flames participated in the semi-professional English Premier Ice Hockey League. It was the 17th year of Ice Hockey played by the Guildford Flames and the second season under Paul Dixon as head coach. 

During the summer Dixon worked to improve the defensive line by shipping out Dominic Hopkins and Ben Johnson, replacing them with 17-year-old Steven Lee who had already played two seasons with Elite League side Hull, and bringing toughness to the team in the form of Mark Williams from Romford. Other departures included fringe player Ben Duggan who was replaced by Matt Hepburn from the juniors. The main talking point over the summer was the departure of long time top goal scorer Jozef Kohut, leaving the team with what many believed was a weak offence.

After an indifferent start to the season with 3 wins and 3 losses, it was announced on 9 October that the Flames would travel to Slovakia and take part in an exhibition against Extraliga side Poprad in a game opened by the Queen during her state visit to the country. After a poor run of results in November and a multiple game ban for import Vaclav Zavoral, the decision was taken to sign Czech Martin Bouz. A surprise departure was the main feature of January with Mark Williams leaving to pursue work commitments and to play closer to home with the Romford Raiders.

League table

Final Table

[*] Secured Play-off Berth. [**] EPL League Champions

Peterborough are EPL League Champions 2008/09

Premier Cup table

Final Table

[*] Secured Semi-final Berth.

Premier Cup Finals

Aggregate Scores

 Peterborough Phantoms are the EPL Cup Champions 2008/09

Playoffs

Aggregate Scores for quarter-finals

Peterborough are the 2008/09 EPL Playoff champions

Results

September

October

November

December

January

February

March

April

Points for the 2008/09 season
Final Standing

[*]No Longer on Active Roster

Goaltender Stats 2008/09
Final

Special teams
Final
Powerplay 42 for 204 – 20.6%
Penalty Kill 241 for 293 – 82.3%

Penalty Shots 08/09
Final

Skaters

Goaltenders

End of Season Awards
The traditional End of Season Awards dinner was held on Monday 30 March 2009. The following awards were given out:

Most Sportsman like – #37 Ben Austin

British Player of the year – #8 Rob Lamey

Players Player of the year – #8 Rob Lamey

Top Point Scorer – #21 Milos Melicherik

The GIHSC (Guildford Ice Hockey Supporters Club) Voted the following:

Supporters British Player of the year – #8 Rob Lamey

Supporters Player of the year – #77 Taras Foremsky

Roster
+Management
CEO  Rob Hepburn
Commercial Manager  Kirk Humphreys
Financial Controller  Thomas Hepburn

Coaching staff
Head coach  Paul Dixon
Assistant coach  Milos Melicherik
Assistant/equipment manager  Dave Wiggins
 
Goaltenders
30  Joe Watkins
31  Alex Mettam 
 
Forwards
8  Rob Lamey
12  Matt Hepburn
14  Stuart Potts
17  Rick Plant – Captain
18  Callum Best
19  Terry Miles
21  Milos Melicherik – Alternate Captain
25  Vinnie Zavoral
32  Lukas Smital
44  Nick Cross
47  Martin Bouz
76  Taras Foremsky
91  Ollie Bronnimann
 
Defenders
4  Neil Liddiard – Alternate Captain
6  David Savage
22  Paul Dixon
24  Mark Williams
37  Ben Austin
45  Steve Lee
55  Rick Skene

References

External links
Official Guildford Flames website
Flames Backburner Site (supporters club)

Gui
Guildford Flames seasons